The Residence is a mystery-drama streaming television series created by Paul William Davies for Netflix. Inspired by The Residence: Inside the Private World of the White House by Kate Andersen Brower, the series revolves on a murder scandal involving staffs on the White House. Produced by Shondaland, the series is set to launch globally on the streaming platform.

Premise 
Set in "upstairs, downstairs, and backstairs" of the White House, Cordelia Cupp, an eccentric detective, arrives on the premise in order to solve a murder case happened during the state dinner. During the investigation, interpersonal conflicts between 157 personnel of the residence start to unfold.

Cast 

 Uzo Aduba as Cordelia Cupp
 Andre Braugher as A.B. Wynter
 Susan Kelechi Watson as Jasmine Haney
 Jason Lee as Tripp Morgan
 Ken Marino as Harry Hollinger
 Edwina Findley as Sheila Cannon
 Randall Park as Edwin Park
 Molly Griggs as Lilly Schumacher
 Al Mitchell as Rollie Bridgewater
 Dan Perrault as Colin Trask
 Spencer Garrett as Wally Glick
 Bronson Pinchot as Didier Gotthard
 Isiah Whitlock Jr. as Larry Dokes
 Mary Wiseman as Marvella
 Matt Oberg as Nick Simms
 E.L. Losada as St. Pierre
 Alexandra Siegel as Valentina Motta
 Ryan Farrell as Lorenzo Motta

Production

Development 
On July 20, 2018, Netflix announced The Residence as a part of nine-figure deal between the streamer and Shondaland, with both of them acquiring the rights to adapt the non-fiction book it based upon, The Residence: Inside the Private World of the White House, written by Kate Andersen Brower. On March 7, 2022, It was unveiled that The Residence would consists of eight-one hour episodes with Paul William Davies, writer of Scandal and creator of For the People, serving as the executive producer and showrunner of the series as a part of his overall deal with Netflix. Shonda Rhimes and Betsy Beers of Shondaland would also join Davies as executive producers. On February 27, 2023, Liza Johnson was announced as the director for the series first four episodes.

Casting 
On February 1, 2023, Uzo Aduba was announced as the lead character of the series. More casts were revealed on February 27, 2023, with Andre Braugher, Susan Kelechi Watson, Ken Marino, Jason Lee, Bronson Pinchot, Isiah Whitlock Jr., Edwina Findley, Molly Griggs, Al Mitchell, Dan Perrault and Mary Wiseman joining Aduba in supporting roles. On March 7, 2023, Randall Park and Spencer Garrett were revealed to have joined the cast in a main and a recurring role respectively. The next day, four more casts are announced which consists of E.L. Losada, Matt Oberg, Ryan Farrell, and Alexandra Siegel.

Filming 
On July 18, 2022, It was revealed that the series received tax credits from California Film Office worth US$13,95 million.

References

External links 

 
 

2020s American drama television series
2020s American political television series
2020s drama television series
2020s mystery television series
English-language Netflix original programming
Murder in television
Television series by Shondaland
Television shows about murder
Upcoming Netflix original programming
White House in fiction